"Love Me Down" is the title of a number-one R&B song recorded by Freddie Jackson and written by Barry J. Eastmond and Jolyon Skinner from his 1990 album, Do Me Again. The song spent two weeks at number one on the U.S. R&B chart in the beginning of 1991.

See also
List of number-one R&B singles of 1991 (U.S.)

References

1990 singles
Freddie Jackson songs
1990 songs
Songs written by Barry Eastmond
Songs written by Jolyon Skinner